Dušan Pohorelec (born 20 November 1972) is a Slovak ice hockey player. He competed in the men's tournament at the 1994 Winter Olympics. He also played 54 games for the Slovakia national team, scoring 14 goals.

References

1972 births
Living people
Olympic ice hockey players of Slovakia
Ice hockey players at the 1994 Winter Olympics
People from Detva District
Sportspeople from the Banská Bystrica Region
HC Slovan Bratislava players
HKM Zvolen players
Expatriate ice hockey players in England
Expatriate ice hockey players in Croatia
Slovak expatriate sportspeople in England
Slovak expatriate sportspeople in Croatia
Slovak expatriate ice hockey players in the Czech Republic
Slovak expatriate ice hockey players in Germany
Slovak ice hockey right wingers
Czechoslovak ice hockey right wingers